Coraebus elatus is a species of jewel beetles belonging to the family Buprestidae, subfamily Agrilinae.

This beetle is present in most of Europe, in the Near East, and in the eastern Palearctic realm.

Main larval host plants are in genera Agrimonia, Filipendula, Fragaria, Lapsana, Potentilla, Poterium and Sanguisorba.

Subspecies
Coraebus elatus elatus (Fabricius, 1787)
Coraebus elatus repletus (Abeille de Perrin, 1893)

External links
 Kerbtier
 Biolib
 Fauna Europaea

Buprestidae
Beetles of Europe
Beetles described in 1787